Black Nativity  is an adaptation of the Nativity story by Langston Hughes, performed by an entirely black cast. Hughes was the author of the book, with the lyrics and music being derived from traditional Christmas carols, sung in gospel style, with a few songs created specifically for the show. The show was first performed Off-Broadway on December 11, 1961, and was one of the first plays written by an African American to be staged there. The show had a successful tour of Europe in 1962, one of its appearances being at the Spoleto Festival of Two Worlds in Italy. 

Black Nativity has been performed annually in Boston, Massachusetts at various locations, such as: the Elma Lewis School of Fine Arts, Boston Opera House, Tremont Temple, Roxbury Community College, Northeastern's Blackman Auditorium, and presently at Emerson College's Paramount Theater. It has been performed in Boston since 1970 and is considered the longest-running production of Langston Hughes' Black Nativity. The original 160 singers were arranged by age group and vocal range, with an assortment of soloists, along with the narrator, and Mary and Joseph, who are both mute, as well as musicians & ASL interpreters.

The show began with the theater completely darkened. Barefoot singers clad only in white robes and carrying (electric) candles walked in, singing the classic hymn "Go Tell It on the Mountain". The birth of Jesus was one of the most dramatic aspects of the show. The stage, previously lit with orange and blue lights, was bathed in a deep red hue. Mary's contractions were echoed through the use of African drums and percussion. The Three Wise Men were often played by prominent members of the black community in the neighboring area, and had no singing parts. The show closed with the chorus singing a reprise of "Go Tell It on the Mountain" as they walked out in darkness. A final soliloquy by a young child ended the performance.

The original name for this play was Wasn’t It a Mighty Day? Alvin Ailey was a part of the original Off-Broadway cast, but he and Carmen de Lavallade departed from the show prior to its opening, in a dispute over the title being changed to Black Nativity.

A performance of this musical also has taken place every Christmas season since 1998 in Seattle, first at the Intiman Theater and currently at the Moore Theater. The theatrical director is Jackie Moscou, the music director is Patrinell Wright, and the choreography was designed by Donald Byrd. It is a smaller production with 30 or so choir members – most of whom are also members of The Total Experience Gospel Choir, led by Pastor Patrinell Wright, and the performance also includes 10 dancers and five musicians.

Adaptations
In 2004, a documentary film was made about the world premiere performance, production, and creation of the best-selling gospel Christmas album Black Nativity – In Concert: A Gospel Celebration, and the original cast, under the direction of Aaron Robinson that brought it to life at the Immanuel Baptist Church in Portland, Maine.

A film version directed by Kasi Lemmons and starring Forest Whitaker and Angela Bassett was released on November 27, 2013.

References

External links
BlackNativity.org
Black Nativity debuts on Broadway from the African American Registry
NCAAA page
Black nativity files, 1961-1980, held by the Billy Rose Theatre Division, New York Public Library for the Performing Arts

Plays by Langston Hughes
1961 plays
All-Black cast Broadway shows
Christmas musicals